Achilleol B synthase is an enzyme with systematic name (3S)-2,3-epoxy-2,3-dihydrosqualene mutase (cyclizing, achilleol-B-forming). This enzyme catalyses the following chemical reaction

 (3S)-2,3-epoxy-2,3-dihydrosqualene  achilleol B

Achilleol B is probably formed by cleavage of the 8-14 and 9-10 bonds of (3S)-2,3-epoxy-2,3-dihydrosqualene.

References

External links 
 

EC 5.4.99